The 1990 Recopa Sudamericana was the second Recopa Sudamericana, an annual football match between the winners of the previous season's Copa Libertadores and Supercopa Sudamericana competitions. Originally, the title was supposed to be disputed on a two-legged series. Due to security concerns on the eventual, first leg in Colombia and schedule congestion; a neutral stadium was chosen for the match to take place. The Orange Bowl in Miami became the venue for this year's Recopa Sudamericana final.

The match was contested by Atlético Nacional, winners of the 1989 Copa Libertadores, and Boca Juniors, winners of the 1989 Supercopa Sudamericana, on March 17, 1990. Boca Juniors managed to defeat Atlético Nacional 0-1 to lift the trophy for the first time.

Qualified teams

Match details

References

1990
Rec
Boca Juniors matches
Atlético Nacional matches
REc
1990

pl:Recopa Sudamericana#1990